Frederick Henry Connelly (3 January 1882 – 1950) was an English professional footballer who played in the Football League for Bristol City as an inside left.

Career statistics

References

English footballers
Brentford F.C. players
English Football League players
Association football inside forwards
Bristol City F.C. players
Southern Football League players
1882 births
Footballers from West Ham
1950 deaths
Rotherham County F.C. players
Mexborough F.C. players